APH, Aph, or APh may refer to:

 A. P. Herbert, a British writer
 A.P. Hill Army Airfield, IATA airport code
 American Printing House for the Blind
 Arthur Paul Harper (1865–1955), New Zealand lawyer, mountaineer, explorer, businessman known as APH
 Association of Personal Historians
 Antepartum haemorrhage
 L'Année philologique
 APh Technological Consulting
 Air preheater
 Hetalia: Axis Powers, a manga and anime series originally published as Axis Powers Hetelia.
 Australian Parliament House, the meeting place of the Parliament of Australia